Petar Angelov may refer to:

 Petar Angelov (equestrian) (born 1897), Bulgarian Olympic equestrian
 Petar Angelov (military officer) (1878–1926), Bulgarian military officer and revolutionary
 Petar Angelov (alpine skier) (born 1943), Bulgarian alpine skier
 Petar Ivanov Angelov (born 1932), Bulgarian alpine skier
 Petar Angelov (handballer) (born 1977), Macedonian handball player